ATAK  is a Slovak sports equipment company (association football, volleyball, basketball, running, handball, lacrosse, ice hockey and tennis) supplier founded in Prešov, Slovakia in 1991.

Sponsorships
The following teams wear uniforms and apparel manufactured by ATAK:

Association football
  1. FC Tatran Prešov

Ice Hockey

National teams
  Slovakia

Club teams
  HC Slovan Bratislava
  HC Košice
  HKm Zvolen

Handball
  HT Tatran Prešov
  HK Slávia Partizánske

Volleyball
  VK Slávia EU Bratislava
  VK Slávia Svidník
  VK Prešov
  Volley project Nitra

References

Sporting goods manufacturers of Slovakia
Privately held companies
Slovak brands
Sportswear brands
Clothing manufacturers
Manufacturing companies established in 1991
Prešov
Slovakian companies established in 1991